League tables for teams participating in Ykkönen, the second tier of the Finnish Soccer League system, in 1993.

League tables

Preliminary stage

Promotion/relegation group

NB: Top six to Premier Division 1994, the rest to Division One 1994.

Relegation Group

See also
Veikkausliiga (Tier 1)

References

Ykkönen seasons
2
Finland
Finland